Ayaz Naik, also known as Ayaz (Urdu;ایاز; born 1966) is a Pakistani actor. He acted in both Urdu and Punjabi films and he also appeared in dramas Dastak, Sangchoor, Junoon and Chand Grehan.

Early life
Ayaz was born in Lahore and he studied CSS to be a government officer from University of Lahore.

Career
Ayaz started his acting career in 1980 and he was fourteen years when he did his first lead role in film Nahin Abhi Nahin directed by Nazar-ul-Islam starring with famous actress Shabnam and Faisal Rehman. The film was a box office and crowned as a golden jubilee hit and it further boasted the career of Ayaz.

In 1980s Ayaz appeared in films Yeh Zamana Aur Hai, Ek Doojay Kay Liye in both films he starred with Babra Sharif, Naam Mera Badnam in which he starred with Shabnam, Muhammad Ali, Kaveeta and Sangeeta.

In 1984 Ayaz starred in film Ishq Nachaway Gali Gali with Sabiha Khanum the film was a hit and for his role in film Ishq Nachaway Gali Gali he won Nigar Award of Best Actor.

Then Ayaz made his debut in a lead role in drama Dastak written by Haseena Moin and directed by Shahzad Khalil on PTV with Shazia Akhtar.

Personal life
Ayaz married his co-star model and actress Shazia Akhtar with whom he starred in drama Dastak. They married in 1990s but after few years later they divorced. Ayaz's father named Naeem Naik was a civil servant in Islamabad but later he also did acting and he acted in drama Qurbatein Aur Fasley and his mother Zareena was an actress. He is the cousin of Pakistani-British singer Yasir Akhtar and also of television director and producer Mehreen Jabbar. Ayaz's paternal uncle Ejaz Naik was a senior bureaucrat  in the foreign ministry.
Presently he is posted as CSP officer in Islamabad.

Filmography

Television

Film

Awards and recognition

References

External Links
 

1966 births
Living people
20th-century Pakistani male actors
Pakistani male film actors
21st-century Pakistani male actors
Nigar Award winners
Male actors in Punjabi cinema
Pakistani male television actors
Male actors from Lahore
Male actors in Urdu cinema